The 2014 Korean Series was the championship series of the 2014 Korea Professional Baseball season. The regular season champions, the Samsung Lions, defeated the Nexen Heroes in six games to win their fourth consecutive Korean Series championship.

Summary

Matchups

Game 1
Tuesday, November 4, 2014 - 6:30 p.m. (KST) at Daegu Baseball Stadium in Daegu

Game 2
Wednesday, November 5, 2014 - 6:30 p.m. (KST) at Daegu Baseball Stadium in Daegu

Game 3
Friday, November 7, 2014 - 6:30 p.m. (KST) at Mokdong Baseball Stadium in Seoul

Game 4
Saturday, November 8, 2014 - 2:00 p.m. (KST) at Mokdong Baseball Stadium in Seoul

Game 5
Monday, November 10, 2014 - 6:30 p.m. (KST) at Jamsil Baseball Stadium in Seoul

Game 6
Tuesday, November 11, 2014 - 6:30 p.m. (KST) at Jamsil Baseball Stadium in Seoul

See also
2014 Korea Professional Baseball season
2014 World Series
2014 Japan Series

References

Korean Series
Samsung Lions
Kiwoom Heroes
Korean Series
Korean Series
Korean Series